The Stadttheater Leoben is a theatre in Leoben, Austria.

Theatres in Austria